Christian Scotland-Williamson (born 5 July 1993) is an English professional rugby union player and former American football tight end.  He most recently played for Harlequins, having previously played for Worcester Warriors before changing sport to American Football and then returning to rugby union.

Rugby career
He played for the Worcester Warriors from 2014-2017, where he made 23 overall appearances.  In 2017, he made a tackle and a video of this tackle went viral.  The popularity of the video ultimately caused him to leave rugby to pursue a career in American football. He will return to rugby union ahead of the 2021–22 season having signed for Premiership champions Harlequins.

American football career

Scotland-Williamson's move to American football was facilitated through the National Football League's International Player Pathway program. He signed a practice squad contract with the Pittsburgh Steelers on 1 May 2018. He was waived on 1 September 2018 and was signed to the practice squad the next day. He signed a reserve/future contract with the Steelers on 1 January 2019.

On 31 August 2019, Scotland-Williamson was waived by the Steelers and was signed to the practice squad the next day.

On 30 December 2019, Scotland Williamson was signed by the Steelers to a reserve/future contract. On 20 July 2020, he was waived by the Steelers with a Non-Football Injury designation.

Personal life
Scotland-Williamson was formerly a student at Loughborough University where he earned an Undergraduate Degree in Geography and Economics. He also earned a Master's degree in International Business from the University of Birmingham. Prior to Loughborough, Scotland-Williamson was a boarding house student at the Royal Grammar School in High Wycombe. His favorite subject was Latin.

References

1993 births
Living people
Alumni of Loughborough University
American football tight ends
English players of American football
English rugby union players
Footballers who switched code
International Player Pathway Program participants
Pittsburgh Steelers players
Rugby union players from the London Borough of Waltham Forest
Rugby union players that played in the NFL
Worcester Warriors players
English expatriate sportspeople in the United States
Expatriate players of American football
Rugby union locks